Trip Ubusan: The Lolas vs. Zombies is a 2017 Filipino zombie comedy film directed by Mark A. Reyes, starring Jose Manalo, Wally Bayola and Paolo Ballesteros. It is a spin-off film of Eat Bulaga!'''s segment, Kalyeserye. The film's name is a play on the title of the 2016 South Korean film, Train to Busan. It is under the production of M-Zet Productions, to be part by APT Entertainment, and was released in Philippine cinemas on November 22, 2017. The movie was distributed by GMA Network.

Synopsis
As Charmaine, daughter of both Alden and Yaya Dub grows up, she experiences a nightmare involving her mother turned into an infected zombie. Her grandparents, the Lolas reassure their grandchild and promise a trip for her. A few days later, they join a tour group to go in a beach. As they rest in a gas station, a zombie attacks the employees of the station. The infection spreads, killing and infecting civilians. They board the bus, alongside others to escape the area. Their survival resides in the knowledge of a kid about zombie types, and how to counter them. They do everything to survive until they reach a safe zone.

Cast
Main cast
 Jose Manalo as Lola Tinidora Zobeyala - "The Liberated and Free-Spirited Lola"
 Wally Bayola as Lola Nidora Esperanza Zobeyala vda. de Explorer - "The Traditional and Conservative Lola" 
 Paolo Ballesteros as Lola Tidora Zobeyala - "The Fashionated Lola"

Supporting cast
 Ryzza Mae Dizon as Marcelina "Marcy" Dimacuycoy - "The Zombie Expert". She is the one who has knowledge about the zombies. She also describes the type of zombies: the Walkers (normal walking zombie), the Sleepers (slumbering zombies, awakening when loud noise was heard) and the Runners (fast-moving zombies).
 Caprice Cayetano as Charmaine Nidora Richards - "The Importunate Great-Granddaughter". An unfortunate but lovable granddaughter of the Lolas. Alden and Yaya Dub's daughter.
 Angelika de la Cruz as Madam Evangeline "Eva" Flores - "The Artistic Woman". A selfish, wealthy aristocrat who is desperate not to be infected. 
 Lovely Abella as Abegail "Abe" Salazar - "The Bitter Ex-Girlfriend". Later, she will have deep feelings for Jordan.
 Taki of Faky as Irish "Rish" del Rosario - She is Aladin's secret girlfriend even though she has strict parents.
 Kenneth Medrano as Aladin Galvez - "The Secret Boyfriend". He is Irish's secret boyfriend.  
 Miggy Tolentino as William "Will" Robles - The Social Media Addict".
 Shaira Diaz as Catherine "Cath" Lacerna - "The Adventurous Rocker Chick".

Extended cast
 Arthur Solinap as Jordan - "The Broken-Hearted Driver". An honest and protective driver. He has feelings for Abe.
 Rochelle Pangilinan-Solinap as Ivy - the zumba dancer friend of Lola Nidora. 
 Archie Adamos as Loid - is a prisoner who helps the lolas and people in the bus.
 Jhayvot Galang as Melo - the friend of Cath and Will.
 Bernardo's - Tidora's henchmen 
 Rogelio's - Nidora's henchmen 
 Quando's - Tinidora's henchmen

Special participation
 Al Tantay as Incharge officer at a checkpoint
 Joshua Zamora as Greg - husband of Eva
 Niño Muhlach as Customer man - the very first one to transform as a zombie who ate an infected crispy pata.
 Alden Richards and Maine Mendoza as Charmaine's Father and Mother (voice only)

Production
The principal photography of Trip Ubusan took 30 days and the production studio behind the film, APT Entertainment had to adjust the filming schedule to accommodate actors Paolo Ballesteros, Wally Bayola, and Jose Manalo's busy schedule. The film was reportedly inspired from the Korean horror film, Train to Busan. The film, which was described as a horror comedy film, is said to feature some dramatic scenes.

ReleaseTrip Ubusan opened on November 22, 2017 in almost 200 cinemas nationwide.

ReceptionTrip Ubusan received an A rating from the Cinema Evaluation Board. It received mixed reviews from various film critics.

See also
 List of zombie films
 Kalyeserye My Bebe Love Enteng Kabisote 10 and the Abangers''

References

External links
 

2017 films
Zombie comedy films
Philippine comedy horror films
Philippine drama films
APT Entertainment films
M-Zet Productions films
2010s Tagalog-language films
Films set in Metro Manila
2017 comedy horror films
Filipino zombie films
2010s English-language films
Films directed by Mark A. Reyes